Bleak House is the first BBC adaptation of Charles Dickens' 1853 novel of the same name. It was adapted by Constance Cox as an eleven-part series of half-hour episodes first transmitted from 16 October 1959. Unlike most television series of the 1950s, the complete serial survived and, in 2017, was released to DVD by Simply Media.

Cast
Andrew Cruickshank as John Jarndyce
Diana Fairfax as Esther Summerson
Colin Jeavons as Richard Carstone
Elizabeth Shepherd as Ada Clare
Iris Russell as Honoria, Lady Dedlock
Timothy Bateson as William Guppy
John Phillips as Mr. Tulkinghorne
David Horne as Sir Leicester Dedlock
Richard Pearson as Inspector Bucket
Malcolm Knight as Jo
Eileen Draycott as Mrs. Rouncewell
Jerome Willis as Mr. Woodcourt
Michael Aldridge as Mr. George
Nora Nicholson as Miss Flite
Annette Carell as Mlle. Hortense
Angela Crow as Charley

Archive Status
All episodes were originally either broadcast live or recorded on 405 line black and white videotapes, with 35mm film inserts for exterior scenes. Although the original recordings for the studio and location work no longer exist, the series was telerecorded, and 16mm film copies have survived intact. At one point during one of the later episodes, an insect can be seen on the screen, having crawled across it during the recording. As the error was unavoidable, no copy of the episode without an insect on the screen exists.

Critical reception
On the series DVD release, Archive Television Musings wrote "Lacking the visual sweep of the later adaptations, this version of Bleak House has to stand or fall on the quality of its actors. Luckily, there's very little to complain about here. There are some fine central performances – Fairfax, Cruickshank and Jeavons especially – whilst...there's strength in depth from the supporting players with Timothy Bateson standing out. Another strong early BBC Dickens serial, Bleak House comes warmly recommended.

References

External links 
 

1959 British television series debuts
1959 British television series endings
1950s British drama television series
BBC television dramas
Films based on works by Charles Dickens
Television series set in the 1850s
Television shows based on works by Charles Dickens
1950s British television miniseries
Works based on Bleak House